The A4 road is a long road in Kenya extending from Gilgil in Nakuru County to the Ethiopian border on the East side of Lake Turkana in Marsabit County.

The section Rumuruti-Maralal-Baragoi is considered to be the gateway to Samburu County and, as of 2019, it was being paved from Rumuruti up to Maralal.

Towns  

The following towns, listed from west to east, are located along the highway:

Gilgil
Nyahururu
Rumuruti
Maralal
Baragoi
South Horr
Loyangalani
North Horr
Illeret (the last town before the Ethiopian border)

References 

Roads in Kenya